Aniba novo-granatensis is a species of plant in the family Lauraceae. It is endemic to Colombia.

References

novo-granatensis
Endemic flora of Colombia
Taxonomy articles created by Polbot

Critically endangered flora of South America
Taxobox binomials not recognized by IUCN